The 154th Pennsylvania House of Representatives District is located in Montgomery County and includes the following areas:

 Cheltenham Township
 Jenkintown 
 Springfield Township

Representatives

References

Government of Montgomery County, Pennsylvania
154